Kolarić is a village in central Croatia, in the municipality of Vojnić, Karlovac County. It is connected by the D216 highway.

Demographics
According to the 2011 census, the village of Kolarić has 195 inhabitants. This represents 78% of its pre-war population according to the 1991 census.

The 1991 census recorded that 96% of the village population were ethnic Serbs (240/250), 3.20% were Yugoslavs (8/250) and 0.80% were of other/unknown ethnic origin (2/250).

References

Populated places in Karlovac County
Serb communities in Croatia